Dr Crokes is a Gaelic football and hurling club based in Killarney in County Kerry, Ireland. Notable players include Colm Cooper. 

Founded in 1886, the club's successes include the capture of the All-Ireland Senior Club Football Championship in 1992 and 2017. The club has won the Munster Club Championship on eight occasions - 1991, 1992, 2006, 2011, 2012, 2013, 2016 and 2018. The club has won the Kerry Senior Football Championship on thirteen occasions, most recently in the 2018 championship.

Dr Crokes is the only club in Killarney with a hurling team, which has won the Kerry Intermediate Hurling Championship in 1999 and 2001.

Kerry's 2007 All-Ireland Senior Football Championship winning team was trained by former Dr Crokes trainer Pat O'Shea. The 2013 Kerry senior football panel featured five Crokes players (Colm Cooper, Eoin Brosnan, Kieran O'Leary, Johnny Buckley, and Fionn Fitzgerald). In 2014, Fionn Fitzgerald and Kieran O'Leary captained the Kerry Senior Football team to All-Ireland victory over Donegal.

History
Dr Croke's was founded in 1886. Many members were involved in politics and a lot of them ended up in English prisons.
One of the first notable players was Dick Fitzgerald who was a huge part of the team that brought the first All-Ireland title to the Kingdom in 1903. Another notable club member of that time is Eugene O'Sullivan, a nationalist MP, who became chairman of the Kerry county board, and it was during his tenure that Kerry won four more of its 36 All-Ireland titles at senior football level.

A total of 77 senior All Ireland medals have been won to date by Dr Crokes players.

In addition to the Kerry players, Dr Eamon O'Sullivan of the Crokes coached and trained Kerry All Ireland winning teams, beginning in 1924, and ending in 1962.

Dr Croke's has owned four playing fields; the first being the Cricket Field, Flesk Bridge, which was used up to the 1930s.
In 1936 Fitzgerald Stadium was built by the club members in memory of Dr Croke and Kerry legend Dick Fitzgerald. In the past 20 years two new playing complexes have been acquired and developed by the club at Deerpark and Lewis Road to cater for the ever increasing number of members.

Fr Tom Looney, writing of the Club's early years, said that the senior team had played tournaments and challenges before the County Board was formed. He also stated that the Club captain – John Langford – was one of the committee members at the inaugural meeting of the Kerry county board and that the Club lost the first Kerry County final to Laune Rangers, in what all agreed was the finest match ever witnessed.

Another County final was lost in 1900 before the beginning of a glorious spell when they became known as the Clear Air Boys, or Dickeen Fitz’s (Dick Fitzgerald) team. Four county championships were won in a sixteen–year period, including three in a row: 1912, 1913 and 1914.

The club went into decline, having very lean times on the football field in the 1930s, '40s and early '50s, which was surprising because they could still call on some top class players – three county players at any given time, and the administration was well organised.

In the 1950s becoming once again the dominant team in East Kerry, winning ten O'Donoghue Cup’s in another fifteen year spell, but unfortunately failing in the final stages of the Kerry Senior Football Championship. Maybe no great success in winning for a few years after, but this time the standard was held, and entering the 1980s with a youth policy in place for some years, everyone had hopes for a repeat of the early glory years – this time they were not disappointed.

Everything seemed to come right in the centennial (1986), when the Dr Crokes were again performing against the best and winning Kerry Intermediate Football Championship, County Club Championship, County League, a setback again in two County Finals, but eventually going on to become Kerry Senior Football Championship winners, Munster Senior Club Football Championship winners on two occasions, and then the ultimate prize – the All-Ireland Senior Club Football Championship, won in Croke Park on St. Patrick's Day 1992.

Hurling, which played such an important role within the club in the 1920s, 30s and 40s, was revived and organized in the centennial year. In a short time they have made a huge impact – winning East Kerry competitions, County League Division 3, and were crowned Intermediate Champions of Kerry for 1999 and again in 2000.

Camogie was a game which the Dr Croke ladies were very proficient in during the 1920/1930s. Now the ladies are very much into the football, showing the same expertise and skill and forging a name for themselves in the County and already under age players have gone on to represent Kerry and have won All Ireland medals at under 14s and 16s.

Dr. Crokes have three adult teams football– A,B & C, an under 21, minor, under 16s, 14s, 12s, and coaching every Saturday mornings for under 6, 8, and 10s. hurling 1 intermediate, u16, 14, 12, 10, 8. ladies football Senior, minor, u16, 14, 12, 10, 8.

Books
Dr. Crokes clubmen have published 5 Gaelic football related books:
 Dick Fitzgerald: How to play Gaelic football (1914)
 Dr. Eamonn O'Sullivan: The Art and Science of Gaelic football (1958)
 Club History: Dr. Crokes Gaelic Century (1886–1986)
 Club History: Decade of Glory 1986-1996
 Pat O'Shea: Gaelic football, Training Drills (1996)
 Fr. Tom Looney : King in a Kingdom of Kings (2008)

Notable members
 Eoin Brosnan
 Johnny Buckley
 Sean Clarke
 Colm Cooper
 Kieran Cremin
 Archbishop Dr Croke Patron
 Fionn Fitzgerald
 Kieran O'Leary
 Seanie O'Shea
 Gavin White

Achievements

Football

 All-Ireland Senior Club Football Championship (2) - 1992, 2017
 Munster Senior Club Football Championship (8) - 1990, 1991, 2006, 2011, 2012 2013, 2016, 2018
 Munster Senior Football League Champions (1) 2004
 Kerry Senior Football Championship (13) - 1901, 1912, 1913, 1914, 1991, 2000, 2010, 2011, 2012, 2013 2016 2017, 2018
 Kerry Senior Club Football Championship (11) - 1987, 1990, 1992, 1993, 1996, 2011, 2012, 2013, 2014 2017, 2018
 Kerry Intermediate Football Championship (1) 1985
 Kerry Under-21 Football Championship (2) 1986, 2011
 Kerry County Football League - Division 1 (7) 1988, 2000, 2004, 2005, 2010, 2012, 2015, 2017
 Minor County League Football Championship (7)  1976, 1977, 1982, 1983, 2004, 2005, 2016
 East Kerry Senior Football Championship (O'Donoghue Cup) (29) - 1956, 1957,1958, 1959, 1960, 1961, 1962, 1964, 1965, 1968, 1981, 1982, 1986, 1990, 1991, 1992, 1993, 1995, 2000, 2002, 2004, 2006, 2007, 2008, 2009, 2010, 2011, 2012, 2013, 2018, 2020 

Underage
 Under-11 East Kerry Football Champions - 2007, 2008, 2009
 Under-12 County League Division 1 Phase 1 Football Champions - 2009,2010
 Under-12 County League Division 1 Phase 2 Football Champions - 2010
 Under-12 East Kerry Division 1 Champions - 2009, 2010
 Under-13 County League Division 1 Football Champions - 2011
 Under-14 County League Division 2 Football Champions - 2008
 Under-14 East Kerry League Division 1 Champions - 2011

Hurling

 Kerry Intermediate Hurling Championship 1999, 2001, 2020
 Kerry Junior Hurling Championship Champions - 1990
 Kerry Under-21 Hurling Championship: (1) 2019 (with Kenmare/Kilgarvin)
 Kerry Div 2 Hurling Champions -2004
 Kerry Under-12 Hurling Championship Div 4 - 2004

Ladies Football

 Ladies Junior County Champions - 2009
 Ladies Intermediate County Champions - 2004, 2022

References

External links
Official Dr Crokes GAA Club website
Kerry on Hoganstand.com
National and provincial titles won by Kerry teams
Club championship winners
Kerry GAA site
Irish Times Story

Gaelic games clubs in County Kerry
Gaelic football clubs in County Kerry
Hurling clubs in County Kerry
Sport in Killarney